Litoporus aerius is a cellar spider species found in Venezuela.

See also 
 List of Pholcidae species

References 

Invertebrates of Venezuela
Pholcidae
Spiders of South America
Spiders described in 1893